is the name of  in Abeno-ku, Osaka, Japan.

Overview

Via Abeno Walk is the area for the local tenants, and Q's Mall is the area the specific architect, Tokyu Land Corporation, manages. The area opened on April 26, 2011.

This shopping area is connected to Tennoji Station operated by Osaka Metro by the underground passage. The area is connected to the pedestrian bridge (pre-opened on February 1, 2012, and completed on April 24, 2013) via the Abeno A1 Area Urban Redevelopment Project A1-2 Building (Abeno nini) opened on February 1, 2012 along with the elevated walkway between Cues Town and Abeno nini. The other passage was opened on March 15, 2014 to connect to Abeno Station on the Osaka Metro Tanimachi Line.

Access
Osaka Metro: Tennoji Station (Midosuji Line, Tanimachi Line), Abeno Station (Tanimachi Line)
JR West: Tennoji Station (Yamatoji Line, Osaka Loop Line, Hanwa Line)
Kintetsu Minami Osaka Line: Osaka Abenobashi Station
Hankai Uemachi Line: Tennoji-ekimae

Surrounding area

Abeno-ku

Abeno Urban Redevelopment Project
Abeno Lucias (A1-1 Building)
Abeno nini (A1-2 Building) - connection with the elevated walkway
Abeno Gran Tour (A3 Building)
Abeno Belta (B1 Building)
Kansai Super
Abenobashi Terminal Building
Kintetsu Department Store Main Store Abeno Harukas
Osaka Mariott Miyako Hotel
Harukas 300
Tennoji Miyako Hotel
Hoop
and
Shinjuku Building
Shinjuku Gochiso Building
Abeno Center Building (Abeno Festa)
Abeno Apollo
Echo Across Building (Animate)

Tennoji-ku
Tennoji Mio
Main Building
Plaza Building
Abechika (underground city)

See also
 List of shopping malls in Japan

References

External links
 Via Abeno Walk
 Abeno Q's Mall

Abeno-ku, Osaka
Tokyu Group
Buildings and structures in Osaka
Shopping centres in Japan
Shopping malls established in 2011
2011 establishments in Japan